Columbus Lorenzo Whittington (born August 1, 1952) is a former American football player and coach.  He served as the head football coach at Prairie View A&M University for one season in 2003, compiling a record of 1–10.  Whittington played college football at Prairie View A&M from 1970 to 1973 and then with the Houston Oilers of the National Football League (NFL). He is currently the defensive back coach at Hallsville High School.

Playing career
Whittington played for Prairie View from 1970 to 1973, under head coach each year of his college career: Alexander Durley in 1970, Jim Hillyer in 1971, Theophilus Danzy in 1972, and Cornelius Cooper in 1973.  He later played for the Houston Oilers in the National Football League (NFL) as a defensive back from 1974 to 1978, playing in no less than 12 games each season.

Coaching career

Prairie View A&M
Whittington was the 22nd head football coach at Prairie View A&M University in Prairie View, Texas and he held that position for the 2003 season.  His record at Prairie View was 1–10.

Head coaching record

References

External links
 

1952 births
Living people
American football defensive backs
Frankfurt Galaxy coaches
Houston Oilers players
Prairie View A&M Panthers football coaches
Prairie View A&M Panthers football players
High school football coaches in Texas
People from Beaumont, Texas
Players of American football from Texas
African-American coaches of American football
African-American players of American football
20th-century African-American sportspeople
21st-century African-American sportspeople